Zombie Gunship is a first-person shooter mobile game with a 3D thermal imaging display, where the player is a gunner who fires at zombies from a heavily armed AC-130 ground attack aircraft circling various user-selected maps. The mobile game was developed by Limbic Software and released July 21, 2011 for Apple’s iOS, September 19, 2013 for Android on the Google Play Store, and October 8, 2013 on Amazon.

Gameplay
The objective in Zombie Gunship is to use the AC-130's weapons systems to manually target and kill increasing waves of zombies, who are attacking humans running above-ground to the safety of a bunker. The zombies too are moving toward the bunker to overrun it. To kill zombies and protect the humans, Zombie Gunship makes available three upgradable weapons: a 25mm Gatling gun, a 40mm Bofors auto-cannon, and a 105mm Howitzer cannon. Depending on the weapon, upgrading increases firing rate, speed to target, cooling rate, and damage radius.

The player can complete objectives, earn military ranks, and collect coins for killing zombies and saving humans. Coins can be used for upgrades or bypassing objectives. An individual game ends when the bunker door is sealed to prevent a zombie breaching the bunker, or when the player has killed a maximum number of humans. A hundred coins are earned per human saved and 20 coins per zombie killed plus 2 coins per zombie bounty upgrade. There is no coin penalty for human casualties.

During game play the player can toggle night vision between white and black hot modes. In BHOT mode zombies are white, humans black. In WHOT colors are reversed.

Every 75 humans rescued automatically activates H.S.A.S (Human Sequestration Advisory System), a bonus game mode where there are no humans and the player can accumulate significantly more coins because there are no humans the player must avoid when shooting at zombies.

The iOS version of Zombie Gunship includes Apple’s AirPlay support which allows the game to be played on a television connected to an Apple TV.

Enemies
There are two types of enemies, the walking zombie and the large zombie. Both will attack and kill humans, and they will attempt to enter the bunker. Large zombies appear after a certain number of zombies have been slain. The walking zombies take less damage and can be killed in one shot, whereas the large zombies require multiple shots to kill.

Maps
Four maps exist, each with one safe bunker. Bunker Charlie 1 is a simple terrain containing hills, Bakersfield is an industrial power station with a train running through it every few minutes, Pleasant Acres is a housing tract, and The Lockdown is a large prison complex surrounded by several walls.

Reception
Zombie Gunship received generally positive reviews. In July 2011, IGN Editor’s Choice rated the game a 9/10, claiming it as “a very tough game to put down.” In August 2011, Macworld App Gem rated the game a 4.5/5 describing that “All of these elements—the strategy, the graphics and sound, and yes, the undeniable thrill of sending the undead back to the grave they crawled out of—make for a compelling iOS game.” At the time of launch for Android in September 2013, Android Central declared Zombie Gunship to be "a ton of fun", MythBusters Jaime & Adam's site Tested.com praised that the game "takes a different route to realism, and it works well", and Droid Life insisted that "If you have spent anytime playing Call of Duty, and love getting into the seat of an AC-130, then you will feel right at home with this game."

References

External links
 Limbic website
 Zombie Gunship on iTunes
 Zombie Gunship on Google Play
 Zombie Gunship on Amazon

2011 video games
First-person shooters
IOS games
Video games about zombies
Android (operating system) games
Video games developed in the United States
Single-player video games